Wiederkehr Village is a city in Franklin County, Arkansas, United States. It is part of the Fort Smith, Arkansas-Oklahoma Metropolitan Statistical Area. The population was 38 at the 2010 census. It is named after Swiss winemaker Johann Andreas Wiederkehr, who immigrated to the area in 1880.

Geography

Demographics

As of the census of 2000, there were 46 people, 24 households, and 13 families residing in the city. The population density was 11.3 people per square mile (4.4/km). There were 27 housing units at an average density of 6.6/sq mi (2.6/km). The racial makeup of the city was 95.65% White, 2.17% Native American and 2.17% Asian.

There were 24 households, out of which 16.7% had children under the age of 18 living with them, 41.7% were married couples living together, 4.2% had a female householder with no husband present, and 45.8% were non-families. 37.5% of all households were made up of individuals, and 29.2% had someone living alone who was 65 years of age or older. The average household size was 1.92 and the average family size was 2.54.

In the city, the population was spread out, with 15.2% under the age of 18, 19.6% from 18 to 24, 17.4% from 25 to 44, 26.1% from 45 to 64, and 21.7% who were 65 years of age or older. The median age was 40 years. For every 100 females, there were 155.6 males. For every 100 females age 18 and over, there were 143.8 males.

The median income for a household in the city was $33,750, and the median income for a family was $43,125. Males had a median income of $28,750 versus $13,750 for females. The per capita income for the city was $20,718. There were 15.4% of families and 23.7% of the population living below the poverty line, including 71.4% of under eighteens and none of those over 64.

References

Cities in Arkansas
Cities in Franklin County, Arkansas
Fort Smith metropolitan area